Dana Fuller Ross may refer to:

 Dana Fuller Ross, pseudonym for Noel B. Gerson
 Dana Fuller Ross, pseudonym for James M. Reasoner